Taraxis is a genus of flowering plants belonging to the family Restionaceae.

Its native range is Southwestern Australia.

Species:

Taraxis grossa

References

Restionaceae
Poales genera